Pretorius is a common Afrikaans surname.

Recorded in several forms (including Praetor, Praetorius, Pratorius, Pretorius, (German), and in English Preater, Preter and Pretor), Pretorius is a surname of Germanic origins, although the ultimate origin is the Roman (Latin) word "praetor". This literally meant "leader", but was used in Imperial Rome to describe officials who led processions, as well as the Praetorian Guard, who provided the security for the Senate and the Imperial Roman family. Although apparently first recorded in England several centuries before Germany, which is probably because of lost medieval records, it is rare in England, although now found in some numbers in Austria, Switzerland and South Africa.

People with the surname Pretorius
André Pretorius, South African rugby player
Andries Pretorius (1798–1853), Boer leader
Andries Pretorius (rugby player), South African rugby player
Karla Pretorius (1990-) South African and international netballer
Conway Pretorius, South African rugby player
Dewald Pretorius, South African cricketer
Dewald Pretorius (rugby union), South African rugby player
Dwaine Pretorius, South African cricketer
Frans Pretorius, South African-born, Canadian physicist
Giovanni Pretorius (1972–2021), South African Olympic boxer
Hattingh Pretorius, South African military commander
Jackie Pretorius, racecar driver
Jaco Pretorius, South African rugby player
Johan Pretorius, South African separatist
Kosie Pretorius, Namibian politician
Marianne Pretorius, South African rock climber
Mark Pretorius, South African theologian and philosopher
Mark Pretorius (rugby union), South African rugby player
Marthinus Wessel Pretorius first president of the South African Republic (often known as the Transvaal Republic) and son of Andries
Monique Pretorius, South African Lady, Known as "Queen of the RIK"
Nico Pretorius, South African rugby player
Ryan Pretorius, American football place kicker from South Africa
Sarel Pretorius, South African rugby player
Spanner Pretorius, South African rugby player
Trompie Pretorius, South African rugby player

Fictional Characters
Doctor Septimus Pretorius, fictional mad scientist in Bride of Frankenstein
Edward Pretorius, fictional scientist and main antagonist in the horror film From Beyond

See also
Praetorius
Pretoria
Pastorius (disambiguation)
Pistorius

References

Afrikaans-language surnames